Ogba may refer to:
Ogba people
Ogba language

Language and nationality disambiguation pages